Boleboř is a municipality and village in Chomutov District in the Ústí nad Labem Region of the Czech Republic. It has about 300 inhabitants.

Administrative parts
Villages of Orasín and Svahová are administrative parts of Blatno.

Gallery

References

Villages in Chomutov District
Villages in the Ore Mountains